Aldjia Noureddine Benallègue (1919-2015), was an Algerian physician.

She became the first indigenous female physician in Algeria in 1946.

References

1919 births
2015 deaths
Algerian physicians
20th-century Algerian women